HMS Porlock Bay was a  anti-aircraft frigate of the British Royal Navy, named for Porlock Bay on the northern coast of Somerset. Commissioned in 1946, she served on the American and West Indies Station and as a Fisheries Protection Vessel before being put into reserve in 1949. She was sold to Finland in 1962 and served as the training ship Matti Kurki until 1974.

Construction
The ship was ordered in 1944 from Charles Hill & Sons at Bristol in place of a  Loch Seaforth which had been cancelled on 27 November 1943.  The ship was laid down on 22 November 1944 as Admiralty Job No. 602 (Yard No. 302). She was launched on 14 June 1945 and completed on 8 February 1946. Porlock Bay was the last warship to be built by this shipyard.

Service history

HMS Porlock Bay
After sea trials Porlock Bay was commissioned on 14 February 1946 for service in the America and West Indies Station under the command of Lieutenant Dudley L. Davenport. After training she was attached to the Plymouth Local Flotilla and finally sailed for Bermuda with sister ship  on 22 July. On arrival a minor collision meant that she did not participate with the Squadron in the Autumn Programme of visits to U.S. ports.

Once repaired she took part in visits to Newfoundland and Canada, arriving at St John's on 7 September for the National Convention on the political future of the Colony, and took the Governor, Sir Gordon Macdonald on an official tour of isolated settlements on south coast. After visits on the northern coast, she then visited mainland ports, arriving at Quebec on 15 October. In early November she took part in joint exercises with ships of the Royal Canadian Navy at Halifax before returning to Bermuda to refit at the Royal Dockyard.

In December, while under refit, Commander Frank J. Twiss assumed command, and in January 1947 the ship took part in exercises with the Squadron before making visits to Veracruz, Mexico and Kingston, Jamaica, then Galveston, Texas, Mobile, Alabama, and Key West, Florida before returning to Bermuda in April. In July she took part in a programme of official visits by the Governor of the Bahamas to the Turks and Caicos Islands, but on the 21st was despatched to Belize City in British Honduras after Guatemalan threats to the colony, remaining there until early August.

On 12 September the termination of her commission announced as part of a programme of cuts in naval spending. On 16 October she left Bermuda for the UK, arriving at Devonport on 3 November. Porlock Bay spent the year 1948 as part of the Fishery Protection Squadron in home waters, and was put into reserve at Devonport in January 1949. In February her pennant number was changed to F650 from K650. She remained in Reserve until 1962, during which she was refitted twice.

Matti Kurki
On 19 March 1962 she was sold to the Finnish Navy as the training ship Matti Kurki, named for the Finnish medieval military hero Matti Kurki (Mats Kurck). Matti Kurki made seven global circumnavigations. It is estimated some 1,500 Finnish cadets and conscripts served on board her during her service in the Finnish Navy. She was permanently anchored at Upinniemi after being decommissioned in 1974. She was scrapped in Pohja, Finland, in 1975.

References

Publications
 

 

Bay-class frigates
Ships built in Bristol
1945 ships
World War II frigates of the United Kingdom
Cold War frigates of the United Kingdom
Frigates of the Finnish Navy
Cold War frigates of Finland